Lee County Courthouse is a historic county courthouse in on Courthouse Square in Leesburg, Georgia, the county seat of Lee County, Georgia. It was designed by J.J. Baldwin in Neoclassical Revival architecture and built in 1918.

The building has a Doric tetrastyle entrance. It has a small square domed clock tower.  The interior of the building has a cross plan, with four entrances.  There are additions to the building in the rear.  A staircase leads to the courtroom on the second floor, which was wood paneling and plaster walls.

It was added to the National Register of Historic Places in 1980.

See also
National Register of Historic Places listings in Lee County, Georgia

References

Buildings and structures in Lee County, Georgia
Courthouses on the National Register of Historic Places in Georgia (U.S. state)
County courthouses in Georgia (U.S. state)
Government buildings completed in 1918
Neoclassical architecture in Georgia (U.S. state)